Dennis Kennedy is a writer on Irish and European affairs. His most recent publications include Square Peg; The Life and Times of a Northern Newspaperman South of the Border, Nonsuch, November 2009, and Climbing Slemish: An Ulster Memoir.

Early life and education
Born in Lisburn, Northern Ireland in 1936, Dennis Kennedy was educated at Wallace High School Lisburn, Queen's University, Belfast, and Trinity College Dublin. He graduated in Modern History from Queen's in 1958, and received a PhD from Dublin University (Trinity College) in 1985.

Career
He has worked as a journalist in Northern Ireland, the United States, Ethiopia and the Republic of Ireland, and subsequently as Head of the European Commission office in Belfast, and as lecturer in European Studies in Queen's University Belfast.

His career in journalism began as a reporter with the Belfast Telegraph in 1959. In 1963 he won a Fellowship with the World Press Institute in Minnesota, US, spending more than a year in the United States, including three months working with the Newark News, in New Jersey.  He has documented this year in the book Yankee Doodles which includes his account of being in the White House on the day of President John F Kennedy's funeral.  In 1964 he returned to the Belfast Telegraph as Chief Leader writer, leaving in 1966 to take up a position with the Lutheran World Federation as assistant news editor at their radio station, RVOG, in Addis Ababa, Ethiopia.

In 1968 he returned to Ireland, joining The Irish Times in Dublin as a reporter. He was appointed Diplomatic Correspondent in 1969, European Editor in 1972, Assistant Editor in 1974 and Deputy Editor in 1982. In 1985 he ended 17 years with The Irish Times and returned to Belfast to take up the post of Head of the European Commission Office in Northern Ireland. (1985–1991). In 1993 he joined the academic staff of Queen's University, Belfast as a research fellow, and later lecturer, in European Studies.  He retired in 2001.

He was President of the Irish Association for Economic, Cultural and Social Affairs 2000–01, President of the Belfast Literary Society, 2006–07, and a founder member of The Cadogan Group (est 1991).

Publications
Belfast's Giants: Thirty-six Views of Samson and Goliath - Ormeau Books November 2015.

Dublin's Fallen Hero – The Long Life and Sudden Death of Nelson's Pillar (1809–1966), Ormeau Books, 2012.

Yankee Doodles – A memorable year in America 1963–64, Ormeau Books, 2012.

Square Peg; The Life and Times of a Northern Newspaperman South of the Border, Nonsuch, November 2009.  This book was recently launched at the Irish Writers Centre in Dublin by John Horgan, Irish Press Ombudsman.

Climbing Slemish: An Ulster Memoir, Trafford, 2006.  Second edition Ormeau Books 2015 

Forging an Identity: Ireland at the Millennium, the Evolution of a Concept — Irish Association Publication – 2000.

Widening Gulf: Northern Attitudes to the Independent Irish State, 1919–49, Blackstaff Press Ltd; Reprint edition (Aug 1988)  .

Personal life
He married Katherine Hickey in 1965, and they have three children.

References

External links

1930 births
Expatriates from Northern Ireland in the Republic of Ireland
Journalists from Northern Ireland
Living people
Male non-fiction writers from Northern Ireland